Leon Boles (September 25, 1887 – April 26, 1914) was an American Negro league catcher in the 1910s.

A native of Missouri, Boles played for the Leland Giants in 1911. In four recorded games, he posted one hit in 16 plate appearances. Boles died in Chicago, Illinois in 1914 at age 26.

References

External links
Baseball statistics and player information from Baseball-Reference Black Baseball Stats and Seamheads

1887 births
1914 deaths
Place of birth missing
Leland Giants players
Baseball catchers
Baseball players from Missouri
20th-century African-American people